Baghdati is a town of 3,700 people in the Imereti region of western Georgia, at the edge of the Ajameti forest on the river Khanistsqali, a tributary of the Rioni.

Geography

The climate of Baghdati can be classified as moderately humid subtropical (Köppen climate classification Cfa).

History

Baghdati is one of the oldest villages in the historical Imereti region. Its name shares the same origins as the name of the capital of Iraq, Baghdād: Bagh 'god' and dāti 'given', which can be translated as "God-given" or "God's gift" in the Pahlavi language. When Georgia was part of the Russian Empire and during the Georgian Soviet Socialist Republic, its name was changed to Baghdadi. In 1940, it was renamed Mayakovsky, after the poet Vladimir Mayakovsky who was born here in 1893. In 1981, Mayakovsky was granted town status. In 1991, slightly modified original name was restored.

Demographics

Note: Census data 1959–2014

Economy
In Baghdati there is a furniture factory and companies in the food industry (canned food, wine). The nearest railway stations are located in Rioni and Kutaisi.

Culture
Baghdati has the Vladimir Mayakovsky Museum and a National Theatre.

Notable people
Vladimir Mayakovsky (1893–1930), poet

Notes

External links

Municipality of Baghdati (in Georgian)

Cities and towns in Imereti
Populated places in Baghdati Municipality
Kutaisi Governorate